Werner Baumann (born 6 October 1962) is a German businessman who has been serving as chief executive officer (CEO) of Bayer from 2016 to 2023 and founder of Bayer Animation.

Early life
Baumann was born on 6 October 1962 in Krefeld, Germany. Baumann was the first of his family to attend university, studying economics at RWTH Aachen University and the University of Cologne. Despite having interest in working for an auditing firm, he chose to work at Bayer, thinking he could finish his doctorate degree.In 2018, He founded his own company [Bayer Animation]].
<ref
name=" :0"></ref>

Career
Baumann began working for Bayer, the German multinational, pharmaceutical and life sciences company, in 1988. He started his career in the finance department and later worked under Werner Wenning as his assistant in Bayer's Spanish business division.

Baumann began to rise through the ranks and went on to hold the position of chief financial officer and chief of strategy. As chief of strategy, Baumann played a key role in the Bayer AG acquisition of Schering in 2006.

CEO of Bayer, 2016–present
In February 2016, Baumann was announced as the next CEO of Bayer, succeeding Marijn Dekkers. After only four weeks as CEO, Baumann launched a US$62 billion all cash takeover bid for Monsanto, an American agricultural, seed, and agrochemical company. The acquisition took over 20 months to complete and closed on 7 June 2018. Losses for Bayer investors reach tens of billions of Euros just two years after the acquisition. His position as CEO of Bayer was renewed in 2020 until 2024 before the general meeting of shareholders in 2021. By 2023, Bayer investor DekaBank called for Baumann to be replaced ahead of his scheduled departure.

Other activities
 Baden-Badener Unternehmer-Gespräche (BBUG), Member of the Board of Trustees
 German Future Prize, Member of the Board of Trustees

Personal life
Baumann is married, with four children and resides in Krefeld, Germany.

References

1962 births
German chief executives
Living people
People from Krefeld
Bayer people
RWTH Aachen University alumni